Hemipsilichthys papillatus is a species of loricariid catfish endemic to Brazil, where it is restricted to the Rio Preto, a tributary of the Paraíba do Sul, in the southeastern states of Minas Gerais, Rio de Janeiro and São Paulo. This species grows to a length of  SL.

References

Loricariidae
Fish of Brazil
Endemic fauna of Brazil
Fish described in 2000